Characteristic velocity or , or C-star is a measure of the combustion performance of a rocket engine independent of nozzle performance, and is used to compare different propellants and propulsion systems. c* should not be confused with c, which is the effective exhaust velocity related to the specific impulse by: . Specific Impulse and effective exhaust velocity are dependent on the nozzle design unlike the characteristic velocity, explaining why C-star is an important value when comparing different propulsion system efficiencies. c* can be useful when comparing actual combustion performance to theoretical performance in order to determine how completely chemical energy release occurred. This is known as c*-efficiency.

Formula

  is the characteristic velocity (e.g. m/s, ft/s)
  is the chamber pressure (e.g. Pa, psi)
  is the area of the throat (e.g. m2, in2)
  is the mass flow rate of the engine (e.g. kg/s, slug/s)

  is the specific impulse (e.g. sec)
  is the gravitational acceleration at sea-level (e.g. m/sec^2) 
  is the thrust coefficient
  is the effective exhaust velocity (e.g. m/sec) 
  is the specific heat ratio for the exhaust gases 
  is the gas constant per unit weight (e.g. J/kg-K)
  is the chamber temperature (e.g. K)

References
 Rocket Propulsion Elements, 7th Edition by George P. Sutton, Oscar Biblarz
 Rocket Propulsion Elements, 9th Edition by George P. Sutton, Oscar Biblarz
Rocketry
Rocket propulsion
Aerospace engineering